HD 73389 is a binary star system in the constellation Carina. It has the Bayer designation e2 Carinae; HD 73389 is the identifier from the Henry Draper Catalogue. This system is visible to the naked eye as a point of light with a combined apparent visual magnitude of +4.84. Based on parallax measurements, it is located at a distance of approximately 225 light years from the Sun. The system is drifting further away with a radial velocity of +25.6 km/s.

The visual magnitude 5.08 primary, component A, is an aging K-type giant star with a stellar classification of K0III. With the supply of hydrogen at its core exhausted, it has cooled and expanded to 11 times the Sun's radius. It is radiating 64 times the luminosity of the Sun from its enlarged photosphere at an effective temperature of 4,903 K. The secondary companion, component B, has a visual magnitude of 8.02 and is located at an angular separation of  along a position angle of 207° from the primary, as of 2015.

References

K-type giants
Binary stars
Carina (constellation)
Carinae, e2
Durchmusterung objects
073389
042134
3414